Elke Roex (born 29 June 1974) is a Belgian, Flemish politician and member of the Flemish Parliament for the Socialist Party – Different (SP.A) since 2004 and a member of the City Council of Anderlecht. She lives in the architecturally unique district La Roue/Het Rad.

External links 
 Elke Roex - official website.

1974 births
Living people
Socialistische Partij Anders politicians
21st-century Belgian politicians
21st-century Belgian women politicians